In the science of fluid flow, Stokes' paradox is the phenomenon that there can be no creeping flow of a fluid around a disk in two dimensions; or, equivalently, the fact there is no non-trivial steady-state solution for the Stokes equations around an infinitely long cylinder. This is opposed to the 3-dimensional case, where Stokes' method provides a solution to the problem of flow around a sphere.

Derivation
The velocity vector  of the fluid may be written in terms of the stream function  as
 
 

The stream function in a Stokes flow problem,  satisfies the biharmonic equation. By regarding the -plane as the complex plane, the problem may be dealt with using methods of complex analysis. In this approach,  is either the real or imaginary part of

 .

We will take the real part without loss of generality.
This is calculated to be equal to

 

Without loss of generality, the disk may be assumed to be the unit disk, consisting of all complex numbers z of absolute value smaller or equal to 1.

The boundary conditions are:

 
 

whenever ,
and by representing the functions  as Laurent series:

 

the first condition implies  for all .

 

Since the complex trigonometric functions  compose a linearly independent set, it follows that all coefficients in the series are zero.

 

Therefore, there can be no motion – the only solution is that the cylinder is at rest relative to all points of the fluid.

Resolution
The paradox is caused by the limited validity of Stokes' approximation, as explained in Oseen's criticism: the validity of Stokes' equations relies on Reynolds number being small, and this condition cannot hold for arbitrarily large distances .

A correct solution for a cylinder was derived using Oseen's equations, and the same equations lead to an improved approximation of the drag force on a sphere.

Unsteady-state flow around a circular cylinder 
On the contrary to Stokes' paradox, there exists the unsteady-state solution of the same problem which models a fluid flow moving around a circular cylinder with Reynolds number being small. This solution can be given by explicit formula in terms of vorticity of the flow's vector field.

Formula of the Stokes Flow around a circular cylinder 

The vorticity of Stokes' flow is given by the following relation:

Special Weber's transform has a non-trivial kernel, but from the no-slip condition follows orthogonality of the vorticity flow to the kernel.

Derivation

Special Weber's transform 
Special Weber's transform  is an important tool in solving problems of the hydrodynamics.

where ,  are the Bessel functions of the first and second kind respectively. For  it has a non-trivial kernel which consists of the functions .

The inverse transform is given by the formula

Due to non-triviality of the kernel, the inversion identity

is valid if .

No-slip condition and Biot–Savart law 

In exterior of the disc of radius   the Biot-Savar law

restores the velocity field  which is induced by the vorticity  with zero-circularity and given constant velocity  at infinity.

No-slip condition for 

leads to the relations for :

where

In particular, from the no-slip condition follows orthogonality the vorticity to the kernel of the Weber's transform :

Vorticity flow and its boundary condition 
Vorticity  for Stokes flow satisfies to the vorticity equation
 or in terms of the Fourier coefficients in the expansion by polar angle

where

From no-slip condition follows 

Finally, integrating by parts, we obtain the Robin boundary condition for the vorticity:

Then the solution of the boundary-value problem can be expressed via Weber's integral above.

Remark 
Formula for vorticity can give another explanation of the Stokes' Paradox. From the arguments above any Stokes' vorticity flow with no-slip boundary condition must be orthogonal to the obtained stationary solutions.

See also
 Oseen's approximation
 Stokes' law

References

Fluid dynamics
Equations of fluid dynamics